Lalrammawia Rammawia  (born 9 January 1991) is an Indian professional footballer who plays as a forward for Nepali outfit Three Star Club in the Martyr's Memorial A-Division League.

Career
Born in Mizoram, Lalrammawia was part of Mizoram football team  which played semi-finals of 2016–17 Santosh Trophy. He also played for Bethlehem Vengthlang FC
and Chhinga Veng FC in Mizoram Premier League and later moved to Three Star Club of Nepal. He appeared with Chhinga Veng, that finished as runners–up in 2018–19 Mizoram Premier League by losing to I-League side Aizawl FC on penalties in the final.

On 9 January 2021, Lalrammawia made his debut in I-League and also for his club against Punjab FC. He scored his first goal for club and in I-league against Gokulam Kerala FC on 20 January 2021, the match ended in 2–0 victory for Aizwal FC.

In November 2021, he again moved to Nepal and resigned with Three Star Club ahead of the team's 2021–22 Martyr's Memorial A-Division League season. They won 3–0 in their first match against Chyasal Youth Club on 20 November.

Career statistics

Honours
Chhinga Veng

I-League 2nd Division runner-up: 2018–19
Mizoram Premier League runner-up: 2018–19
MFA Super Cup: 2018
Independence Day Cup: 2018

Three Star Club
Madan Bhandari Memorial Ithari Gold Cup: 2019
Satashi Gold Cup: 2020

See also
 List of Indian football players in foreign leagues

References

External links
Lalrammawia Rammawia at the-aiff.com
Lalrammawia Rammawia at sofascore.com
Lalrammawia Rammawia at Soccerway

Living people
1991 births
Indian footballers
Association football forwards
Footballers from Mizoram
I-League players
Aizawl FC players
Indian expatriate footballers
Chhinga Veng FC players
Three Star Club players
Expatriate footballers in Nepal